Rizzani de Eccher S.p.A. is an Italian general contractor with headquarters in Pozzuolo del Friuli, in Northeastern Italy, active globally in the areas of engineering, infrastructure and buildings construction.

History

Rizzani was established in Udine, Italy in 1831. Over the following century, Rizzani developed its presence in Italy and ventured in several countries in Africa, Asia and Latin America.

In 1948 Riccardo de Eccher established the company bearing his name in the northern Italian region of Trentino Alto Adige engaging in real estate development.

In 1970 Riccardo de Eccher takes over Rizzani. Ten years later, the construction of two segments of the Carnia-Tarvisio motorway marked the acquisition of technologies for prefabrication and the launching of overhead bridges. These technologies will be constantly developed over the successive years and finally consolidated into Deal S.r.l., a group affiliate specialized in advanced bridge construction technologies. In 1982 the first important overseas project of Rizzani De Eccher was acquired - five schools in Algeria. In 1984 five landmark projects were acquired in what was then the Soviet Union, becoming the first registered Western contractor in the Soviet Union, and marking the beginning of a successful expansion in Russia. The following years were marked by a swift growth. The Group's consolidated revenues grew from 37 billion lira in 1986 to 228 billion lira in 1990.
In 1994 the difficult conditions of the infrastructure and construction Italian market, generally related to mani pulite, the Company decided to focus towards overseas markets. In 2004 Rizzani de Eccher first appeared in the top ten Italian contractors and in the world's 100 largest contractors rankings compiled by Engineering News-Record. By 2005, through its established presence in many countries (Russia and other CIS countries through its Codest subsidiary, Middle East, Mediterranean Basin and North and Central America), the share of overseas revenues tops 70%. It operates in four areas of activity: general building, infrastructure development, equipment manufacturing and specialised engineering for bridges and viaducts and real estate development.
Thanks to its consolidated position in several countries (such as Russia and other CIS countries, the Middle East, East Asia, North and Central America as well as Africa), the Group's share of turnover from overseas operations has always been above 70% since 2005. In 2019 its subsidiary Codest, active in Russia and other CIS countries, was merged with Rizzani de Eccher S.p.A.

The Group operates in the construction sector in three distinct areas:
General contracting of buildings and infrastructure
Design, engineering and special equipment and technologies for bridge construction
Real estate development.

Projects by Area

Italy

Torre Intesa Sanpaolo, design by Renzo Piano (Turin)
Portopiccolo Residential Complex Sistiana (Trieste)
Requalification of Brescia Hospital (Brescia)
CityLife (Milan), design by Daniel Libeskind and Zaha Hadid
Reconstruction of Teatro della Fenice (Venice)
Restoration of Fondaco dei Tedeschi Palace, design by Rem Koolhaas (Venice)
Milano Central Station (Milan)
Cattinara Hospital (Trieste)
Nuovo Salesi Hospital (Ancona)
Tramway Sir 1 (Padua)
Multifunctional Complex (Treviso)
Naval Base (Taranto)
Marghera Cable-Stayed Bridge (Venice)
Therme Hotel & SPA (Merano)
Hotel Savoy (Trieste)
Bauer Hotel (Venice)
Hotel Gritti (Venice)
Hotel Savoy (Florence)
Grand Hotel des Bains (Venice)
Novotel Mestre (Venice)
Hotel Mantegna (Padua)
Palazzo Grassi (Venice) 
Ca' Foscari Palace (Venice)
Government Seat of Friuli-Venezia Giulia Region (Udine)
Stadio Friuli (Udine)
Law Court (Turin)
Technical School (Bolzano)
Modern and Contemporary Museum (Bolzano)
Perfetti Van Melle Industrial Complex (Lainate)
A32-Bardonecchia Motorway (Turin)
A23-Udine-Tarvisio Motorway
Milan-Naples Motorway
A24-Rome-L'Aquila-Teramo Motorway
A20-Messina-Palermo Motorway

Europe

Y-Towers Hotel and Residences (Amsterdam, The Netherlands)
New Bispebjerg Hospital Hospital (Copenhagen, Denmark)
VTB Arena Park (Moscow, Russia) 
VTB Arena - Central Stadium Dynamo (Moscow, Russia)
Docklands-City Airport DLR (Docklands Light Railway) (London, UK)
Cloche d'Or Shopping Center and Residential Towers (Gasperich, Luxembourg)
Four Seasons Hotel Baku (Baku, Azerbaijan)
Urriðaholt Residences (Garðabær, Iceland)
Multi-purpose Centre (Lugano, Switzerland)
World Trade Center (Rijeka, Croatia)
Viaducts Tarsus - Mersin (Turkey)
Limassol-Paphos Highway (Cyprus)
Olympic Complex Luzhniki Swimming Pool (Moscow, Russia)
Ducat Place III (Moscow, Russia)
Design and Construction of a Pavillon of Moscow Exhibition Center (Moscow, Russia)
Balchug Office Complex (Moscow, Russia)
Residential Complex Granatny (Moscow, Russia)
Most Bank Office Building (Moscow, Russia)
Tobacco Factory for Ligget Ducat (Moscow, Russia)
Vnukovo International Airport (Moscow, Russia)
Domodedovo International Airport (Moscow, Russia)
Pedestrian Bridge on Moskva River (Moscow, Russia)
15 Storey Residential Building for St Kapranov LTD (Moscow, Russia)
Shell & Core Residential Building Stolnik (Moscow, Russia)
Industrial Complex for Cremonini Group (Moscow, Russia)
Moscow Medical Center (Russia)
Krylatsky Hills Business Park (Moscow, Russia)
Design and Construction Industrial Plant (Lipetsk, Russia)
Industrial Plant for the Production of Tiles (Stupino, Russia)
Residential Complex at Kazan (Russia)
Radisson Hotel Kiev (Ukraine)
Private Luxury Residence (Kiev, Ukraine)
Baku Business Center (Baku, Azerbaijan)
Private Luxury Residence (Kirchberg, Luxembourg)

Americas

Google Hudson Square HQs (New York City, USA)
Miami I-395 (Florida, USA)
Miami Metro Orange Line (Florida, USA)
Palmetto Dolphin Interchange (Florida, USA)
Washington Bypass (North Carolina, USA)
Manhattan West Development Platform (New York City, USA)
Hathaway Bay Bridge (Florida, USA)
High Five Interchange (Dallas, USA)
Dulles Corridor Metrorail Project (Virginia, USA)
Richmond-Vancouver Airport Light Railway (Canada)
Elevated Guideway for the Skytrain (Vancouver, Canada)
Millenium Line Vancouver Light Railway (Vancouver, Canada)
Evergreen Line Rapid Transit Project (Vancouver, Canada)
Playa Maroma Resort (Playa del Carmen, Mexico)
Cuscatan Bridge (San Salvador, El Salvador)
San Marcos Bridge (San Salvador, El Salvador)
Water Treatment Plant (Montego Bay, Jamaica)
Kingston Regional Hospital (Kingston, Jamaica)
St Ann's Bay Regional Hospital (Jamaica)
Mandeville Regional Hospital (Jamaica)

Middle East, Asia & Oceania

Al Udeid Military Base (Doha, Qatar) 
Dubai Metro (Dubai, UAE)
Golden Market (Abu Dhabi, UAE)
Sheikh Zayed Mosque (Abu Dhabi, UAE)
ADCO (Abu Dhabi, UAE)
Marjan Island Channel Crossings (Ras al Khaimah, UAE)
Private International Roads at Jebel Haffet (Al Ain, UAE)
Shore Protection and Site Preparation Works in Dad Island (Abu Dhabi, UAE)
Jamal Abdul Nasser Street (Kuwait City, Kuwait)
North Manama Causeway (Manama, Bahrain)
Al Kharj Flour Mill (Riyadh, Saudi Arabia)
Summerland Kempinski Hotel & Resort (Beirut, Lebanon)
Almaty International Airport (Almaty, Kazakhstan)
Residential Complex (Atyrau, Kazakhstan)
Presidential Palace (Dushanbe', Tajikistan)
Ismaili Centre (Dushanbe', Tajikistan)
Tajikistan–Afghanistan bridge at Panji Poyon
Line 2 Manila Metro (Manila, Philippines)
Penang 2nd Crossing Bridge (Malaysia)
High-Speed Rail Taipei-Kaohsiung (Taipei, Taiwan)
Bukit Panjang Light Railway (Singapore)
Metropolitan Railway (Ho Chi Minh City, Vietnam)
South Road Superway (Adelaide, Australia)

Africa

RN77 highway between Jijel and El Eulma (Algeria)
Oued Tlélat - Tlmcen High Speed Railway (Algeria)
Five Educational Complexes (Algeria)
Andilana Beach Resort (Nosy Be, Madagascar)
Entebbe International Airport (Kampala, Uganda)
Bata International Airport (Equatorial Guinea)
Patani Bridge (Niger Delta, Nigeria)
Lagos Osborne Bridge (Lagos, Nigeria)
El Ain Sokhna Thermal Power Plant (Egypt)

Awards

ENR Best Bridge or Tunnel Project 2020: Matagarup Pedestrian Bridge (originally Swan River Pedestrian Bridge), located in Perth, Australia
ENR Best Sports or Entertainment Project 2020: VTB Arena - Dynamo Central Stadium, located in Moscow, Russian Federation
Johnson Controls ASPESI "Skyline - Sua Altezza il Grattacielo" Award 2019: Rizzani de Eccher for the construction of Torre Intesa SanPaolo "for its high habitability and maximum eco-sustainability certified Leed Platinum, strongly consolidates the smart vocation of the city of Turin".
ENR's Top 100 Global Contractors Award 2018: Rizzani de Eccher

Financial Data
 In 2020, the Group recorded revenues for €405.5 million, ending the financial year with a loss of € -34.562 million.
 In 2019, the Group recorded revenues for €574,9 million, ending the financial year with a loss of € -13,097 million.
 In 2018, the Group recorded revenues for €960,1 million, ending the financial year with a loss of € -48,182 million.
 in 2017, the group recorded revenue for €1. 073, 003 million, ending the financial year with a net profit of € 21, 225 million 
 in 2016, the group recorded revenue for € 917,8 million, ending the financial year with a net profit of € 24, 216 million

References

Construction and civil engineering companies of Italy
Multinational companies headquartered in Italy
Italian brands
Construction and civil engineering companies established in 1831
Italian companies established in 1831